The Lockheed L-1049 Super Constellation is an American aircraft, a member of the Lockheed Constellation aircraft line. The L-1049 was Lockheed's response to the successful Douglas DC-6 airliner, first flying in 1950. The aircraft was also produced for both the United States Navy as the WV / R7V and U.S. Air Force as the C-121 for transport, electronics, and airborne early warning and control aircraft.

Development

Beginning in 1943, Lockheed planned stretched variants of the Constellation family.

Douglas launched a stretched version of its DC-6 airliner as a cargo transport, designated DC-6A, for both military and civilian operators. Douglas was soon to launch a passenger version (the DC-6B) of this new aircraft. The DC-6B could carry 23 more passengers than Lockheed's current production L-749 Constellation.

In 1950, Lockheed had repurchased the XC-69 Constellation prototype from the Hughes Tool Company. The XC-69 was equipped with four Pratt & Whitney R-2800 radial engines instead of the Wright R-3350s used on production models (Lockheed had installed R-2800s on the prototype to test them as an option for the L-049). The aircraft first flew later in 1950, still fitted with R-2800 engines. It was then fitted with R-3350 956-C18CA-1 engines with jet stacks for slightly increased thrust.

Later modifications included strengthened landing gear and larger vertical stabilizers. Eastern Air Lines ordered 10 aircraft, while Trans World Airlines (TWA) followed with an order for 14. The L-1049 had some 550 improvements and modifications compared to the L-749, including greater fuel capacity, rectangular windows, larger cockpit windshields and improved heating and pressurization.

In 1953, R-3350 Turbo-compounds were made available for civil use. Lockheed incorporated them into the L-1049C, which first flew on February 17 of that year. The R-3350-972-TC18DA-1 turbo-compound engines on the L-1049C had a new turbine system, the Power Recovery Turbines (PRT). The L-1049C had a higher cruising speed and climb rate. Although lacking the range of the DC-6B, the L-1049C had identical performance to the Douglas and could carry a larger payload. The wings of the new model were strengthened, cabin soundproofing was increased, and the landing gear retraction system was improved. A new series of interior layouts was offered for the new model; "Siesta" (47 passengers with increased luxury), "Intercontinental" (54 - 60 passengers) and "Inter-urban" (105 passengers). Each of these new layouts included reading lights at each seat. Forty-eight L-1049Cs were built, being used by Eastern, TWA, Air France, KLM, Trans-Canada Air Lines, Qantas, Air India, Pakistan International Airlines, Avianca, Iberia, Línea Aeropostal Venezolana and Cubana de Aviación.

A freighter version, the L-1049D, first flew in August 1954. It had two cargo doors on the left side and a reinforced magnesium floor as used on the R7V-1 military variant of the L-1049B. At the time of its first flight, the L-1049D was the largest civil cargo aircraft. In the end four were produced, all delivered to Seaboard & Western Airlines. Two of the four L-1049D aircraft were later converted to L-1049H standards.

The L-1049E was more successful; 28 were delivered to eight airlines. Similar to the L-1049C, the L-1049E was able to carry the same load as the L-1049D. The L-1049C and L-1049E could not usually fly Europe to New York nonstop against the wind. Lockheed thought of fitting a new variant based on the L-1049E with more powerful engines, but the project was cancelled. A different variant surfaced: using the L-1049C as a base, R-3350-972-TC18DA-3 turbo-compound engines were fitted. A new Bendix or RCA weather radar could be installed in the nose, which changed the nosecone shape. New Hamilton Standard or Curtiss Electric propellers were offered. This new version of the L-1049 with over 100 modifications from the L-1049C was unveiled as the L-1049G (the L-1049F being already used for the military C-121C). Over 100 L-1049G aircraft were ordered by sixteen airlines. The L-1049G flew on December 17, 1954, and entered service with TWA and Northwest in 1955. The nickname "Super G" (first used by TWA) was later adopted for the L-1049G.

The L-1049H flew on November 20, 1956. Called "Super H" and "Husky", the L-1049H was a convertible passenger/freight aircraft, mating a C-121C-based fuselage with L-1049G components. The cargo hold had a volume of  when including the lower hold. The aircraft could carry up to 120 people with seats, luggage lockers and toilets all available along with the option of decorating the walls of the aircraft. When not in use, the luggage lockers and seats could be stowed in the lower hold. The aircraft entered service with Qantas a month later. Some L-1049G and H aircraft in later production were fitted with the TC-18EA series engines used on the L-1649 Starliner. A final variant was planned in 1957, known as the L-1049J. Powered by four R-3350-988-TC-18EA-6 engines, the L-1049J was based on the L-1049H with the wings of the R7V-2 Constellation and an extra fuselage-mounted fuel tank.

Operational history

The first production L-1049 flew on July 14, 1951, and received certification in November 1951. The Turbo-compound versions of the R-3350 engine were not yet available for civil use, so the engines were  instead of the Turbo-compound's . The aircraft entered service with Eastern Air Lines in December 1951 flying Miami to New York. Eastern would later operate the L-1049C and L-1049G. TWA 1049s began flying in 1952; TWA L-1049Gs flew transatlantic starting in 1955. In 1956 a TWA L-1049 collided with a United Airlines DC-7 over the Grand Canyon, leading to the deaths of all on both aircraft.

KLM introduced the L-1049C on the Amsterdam to New York run in 1953; it also used L-1049Gs to Tokyo and Sydney. Air France used its L-1049Cs across the Atlantic. Seaboard & Western Airlines used L-1049Ds on transatlantic cargo flights to Germany and Switzerland. From the summer of 1955 to the spring of 1956 the British Overseas Airways Corporation (BOAC) leased three Seaboard L-1049Ds for passenger flights. Northwest Orient Airlines L-1049Gs flew Seattle, Washington to Tokyo, Okinawa and Manila in 1955–57. The scheduled freight airline, Flying Tiger Line, used the L-1049H on North American routes and service for the Military Air Transport Service. A Flying Tigers L-1049H was the last Constellation built, in 1959.

The first airline in Latin America with Super Constellations (L-1049E and L-1049G) was Cubana de Aviación, flying them from Havana to Madrid, New York City and Mexico City. Other Latin American Super Constellations were on Línea Aeropostal Venezolana, Avianca, Real Transportes Aéreos, and Varig.

Iberia 1049Gs continued to fly Madrid-Santa Maria-Havana weekly until 1966.

Most Super Constellations were retired by their original operators after the advent of the Boeing 707 and Douglas DC-8; the last passenger L1049 flight in the US was an Eastern shuttle EWR-DCA in February 1968. The last commercial flight of the L-1049 Super Constellation was in 1993, when the Federal Aviation Administration banned all airlines from the Dominican Republic that flew Constellations to the United States (due to safety concerns).  The Dominican airlines were the last operators of any version of the Constellation.

Numerous military versions were operated by the United States Navy and United States Air Force as transports and AWACS platforms. The WV-1 Navy version was used during the Cold War with picket ships on the DEW (Distant Early Warning) lines, one east and one west. These lines were to give early warning of an attack by the USSR. The east line was from Halifax, NS to the Canary Islands and back. The west line was from Hawaii to Midway Island then up to the Aleutians and back. The flights would last up to 14 hours or more. These aircraft served in the Vietnam War in several roles, including transmitting television programs from the United States for the troops on the ground, and observing the Ho Chi Minh Trail. One of them was shot down by North Korean aircraft in 1969.

The last US military Super Constellation, a one-of-a-kind aircraft designated as a NC-121K, Buno 141292, call sign GD-12, was used by the Navy Squadron VAQ-33 Firebirds stationed at NAS Key West, FL to simulate the Russians. This aircraft was retired in June 1982 by the US Navy and custody was transferred to the Florence Air Museum, Florence, SC (now closed). The aircraft was destroyed during a controlled grass burn that got out of control. The Indian Air Force and Indian Navy used former Air India L-1049C, E and G versions converted by Hindustan Aeronautics Limited for use as Sea Air and Rescue aircraft. They were retired between 1981 and 1983 and replaced by Tupolev Tu-142 aircraft. India was the last military operator of the Constellation.

Variants

Civilian

L-1049
Initial production version. 24 built.
L-1049C
Civil version of L-1049B, powered by four R-3350 972-TC-18DA-1 Turbo-compound engines. 48 built.
L-1049D
All-freight version constructed for Seaboard & Western Airlines with the same powerplants as the L-1049C. Four built.
L-1049E
Passenger version of L-1049D. 28 built.

L-1049C with an increased MTOW and four R-3350 972-TC-18DA-3 engines. The options of tip tanks and weather radar were available.
L-1049G/01
Version built for Varig with a strengthened wing, increased MTOW and R-3350 988-TC-18EA-3 engines.

Convertible passenger/freight version of the L-1049G. 53 built.
L-1049H/01
Version built for the Flying Tiger Line with increased MTOW and powered by R-3350 988-TC-18EA-3 engines.
L-1049H/02
Different landing gear and R-3350 988-TC-18EA-6 engines. Two built.
L-1049H/07
Similar to the L-1049H/02. Two built.
L-1049J
Proposed version of the L-1049H/02 with a lengthened wingspan and an extra fuel tank.
L-1149
Proposed version of the L-1049G and L-1049H to be powered by Allison 501D turboprop engines.
L-1449
Proposed turboprop version of L-1049G with a stretched fuselage and a new wing.
L-1549
Planned stretched version of L-1449.

Military
L-1049A
Manufacturer's designation for the WV-2, WV-3 and RC-121D.
L-1049B
Manufacturer's designation for the R7V-1, RC-121C and VC-121E.
L-1049F
Manufacturer's designation for the C-121C with strengthened Landing Gear.
EC-121 College Eye AEW&C aircraft used in the Vietnam War.

Surviving aircraft 
 VH-EAG – L-1049 airworthy with the Historic Aircraft Restoration Society in Albion Park, New South Wales. It received an Engineering Heritage Marker from Engineers Australia.

Specifications (L-1049C)

See also

Notes

Bibliography
Breffort, Dominique. Lockheed Constellation: from Excalibur to Starliner Civilian and Military Variants. Paris: Histoire and Collecions, 2006. Print.

External links

Lockheed Constellation Survivors - A website that explains information and whereabouts of surviving Constellations of all variants, including the Super Constellation.

Super Constellation
1950s United States airliners
Four-engined tractor aircraft
Low-wing aircraft
L-1049
Four-engined piston aircraft
Recipients of Engineers Australia engineering heritage markers
Triple-tail aircraft